Calca is a small township around  south-east of Streaky Bay, on the southern border of the Calpatanna Waterhole Conservation Park, Eyre Peninsula.

The land was occupied by James Baird (for whom nearby Baird Bay was named), calling it "Kolka" (Aboriginal for 'stars'). Baird, also referred to as Henry Baird, was killed by Aborigines in 1850. A pastoral lease was held by Adam Borthwick from 10 February 1856 (lease no. 554).

The postcode for Calca is 5671.

The 2016 Australian census which was conducted in August 2016 reports that Calca had a population of 9 people.

Calca is located within the federal division of Grey, the state electoral district of Flinders and the local government area of the District Council of Streaky Bay.

See also
Calpatanna Waterhole Conservation Park

References

Towns in South Australia
Eyre Peninsula